Nepalese in the Netherlands consists of immigrants, expatriates and international students from Nepal to the Netherlands as well as Dutch people of Nepalese origin. As of 2010, statistics of the Dutch Centraal Bureau voor de Statistiek shows that there are about 1,505 people of Nepalese origin living in the country.

Lhotshampa refugees
The Netherlands are home to a number of Lhotshampa (Bhutanese Nepalis) refugees who were deported from Bhutan. Every year the Netherlands has been resettling around 100 Lhotshampa refugees since 2009. As of November 2011, around 350 refugees got resettled in The Netherlands.

Education
Nepalese students have been studying in the Netherlands since the early 1970s. Every year about a hundred students attend an international program in the Netherlands. So far, about 2,000 Nepalese students have graduated from different institutions all over the Netherlands in areas like Engineering, Law, Social Sciences and Management. Many Nepalese students are supported by the Netherlands Fellowship Program (NFP). The Consulate of the Netherlands is the body responsible for helping prospective Nepalese students in contacting an institution that meets their needs.

Organizations
Until the late 1990s, there was no Nepali-run organizations so almost all Nepal-related programs were organized by the Dutch people. The Nepal Samaj Nederlands was founded in 1999 as a cultural entity, it started to promote various Nepalese festivities among Nepalese and Dutch people who are interested in friendship with Nepalese people, culture, language and food. NSN publishes a news bulletin called Chautrai twice a year in both Nepali and Dutch.

Other organizations include the NRN-NCC Netherlands and the Worldwide Nepalese Students' Organization – Netherlands.

See also
 Hinduism in the Netherlands
 Buddhism in the Netherlands

References

External links
 Nepal Samaj Nederlands
 Non Resident Nepali Association, Netherlands
 Worldwide Nepalese Students' Organization (Netherlands)

Asian diaspora in the Netherlands
Ethnic groups in the Netherlands
Netherlands